Judit Bárányi (born 17 April 1954) is a Hungarian former swimmer. She competed in the women's 100 metre backstroke at the 1968 Summer Olympics.

References

External links
 

1954 births
Living people
Hungarian female swimmers
Olympic swimmers of Hungary
Swimmers at the 1968 Summer Olympics
People from Mezőkövesd
Female backstroke swimmers
Sportspeople from Borsod-Abaúj-Zemplén County